Little Buffalo Creek is a  long 3rd order tributary to Dutch Buffalo Creek in Cabarrus County, North Carolina.

Course
Little Buffalo Creek rises in a pond about 0.5 miles northwest of Gold Hill, North Carolina in Rowan County, and then flows southwest into Cabarrus County to join Dutch Buffalo Creek about 1.5 miles northeast of Mount Pleasant.

Watershed
Little Buffalo Creek drains  of area, receives about 47.3 in/year of precipitation, has a wetness index of 390.20, and is about 50% forested.

References

Rivers of North Carolina
Rivers of Cabarrus County, North Carolina
Rivers of Rowan County, North Carolina